Alfred Zechmeister (born 1 August 1950) is an Austrian sprint canoer who competed in the early 1970s. He was eliminated in the repechages of the K-4 1000 m event at the 1972 Summer Olympics in Munich.

References
Sports-reference.com profile

1950 births
Austrian male canoeists
Canoeists at the 1972 Summer Olympics
Living people
Olympic canoeists of Austria
Place of birth missing (living people)